David Louis Bartholomew (December 24, 1918 – June 23, 2019) was an American musician, bandleader, composer, arranger, and record producer. He was prominent in the music of New Orleans throughout the second half of the 20th century. Originally a trumpeter, he was active in many musical genres, including rhythm and blues, big band, swing music, rock and roll, New Orleans jazz, and Dixieland. In his induction into the Rock and Roll Hall of Fame, he was cited as a key figure in the transition from jump blues and swing to R&B and as "one of the Crescent City's greatest musicians and a true pioneer in the rock and roll revolution".

Many musicians have recorded Bartholomew's songs, but his partnership with Fats Domino produced some of his greatest successes. In the mid-1950s they wrote more than forty hits for Imperial Records, including the Billboard number one pop chart hit "Ain't That a Shame". Bartholomew's other hit songs as a composer include "I Hear You Knocking", "Blue Monday", "I'm Walkin'", "My Ding-a-Ling", and "One Night". He was a member of the Songwriters Hall of Fame, the Rock and Roll Hall of Fame, and the Louisiana Music Hall of Fame.

Biography

Early life
He was born Davis Bartholomew on December 24, 1918, in Edgard, Louisiana, to Mary and Louis Bartholomew. He learned to play his father's preferred instrument, the tuba, then took up the trumpet, taught to him by Peter Davis, who had also tutored Louis Armstrong. Around 1933, Bartholomew moved with his parents to New Orleans, where he played in local jazz and brass bands, including Papa Celestin's, as well as Fats Pichon's band on a Mississippi riverboat. He took charge of Pichon's band in 1941, and after a stay in Jimmie Lunceford's band joined the US Army during World War II. He developed writing and arranging skills as a member of the 196th Army Ground Forces Band.

Early music career
At the end of the war Bartholomew returned to New Orleans and, by November 1945, had started leading his own dance band, Dave Bartholomew and the Dew Droppers, named after a now-defunct local hotel and nightclub, the Dew Drop Inn. The band became locally popular, described as "the bedrock of R&B in the city", and, according to the music historian Robert Palmer, was a "model for early rock 'n' roll bands the world over". A local journalist wrote of the band, in June 1946: "Putting it mildly, they make the house 'rock'." In 1947, they were invited by club owner Don Robey to perform in Houston, Texas, where Bartholomew met Lew Chudd, the founder of Imperial Records.

Bartholomew and his band made their first recordings, including "She's Got Great Big Eyes", at Cosimo Matassa's New Orleans studio for De Luxe Records in September 1947. Their first hit was "Country Boy", credited to Dave Bartholomew and His Orchestra, which reached No. 14 in the national Billboard R&B chart in early 1950. Prominent members of the band, besides Bartholomew on trumpet and occasional vocals, were the saxophonists Alvin Tyler, Herb Hardesty, and Clarence Hall, the bass player Frank Fields, the guitarist Ernest McLean, the pianist Salvador Doucette, and the drummer Earl Palmer. They were later joined by the saxophonist Lee Allen.

Imperial Records and Fats Domino

Two years after they had first met in Houston, Lew Chudd asked Bartholomew to become Imperial's A&R man in New Orleans. Bartholomew produced Imperial's first national hits, "3 x 7 = 21", written by him and recorded by the female singer Jewel King, and "The Fat Man", recorded in December 1949 by a young pianist, Fats Domino. "The Fat Man" — based on the drug-themed "Junker's Blues", with lyrics rewritten by Bartholomew and Domino to attract a wider audience — reached No. 2 on the R&B chart and eventually sold over one million copies, kicking off Domino's career. Both records featured Bartholomew's band, as did a succession of further hits through the 1950s. Bartholomew's "genial, steady-rolling arrangements" contributed to the music's success. Cosimo Matassa said, 'Many times I think Fats' very salvation was Dave being able to be stern enough and rigid enough to insist on things getting done... He was adamant as he could be about the discipline of the players.'

Bartholomew left Imperial after a disagreement with Chudd at the end of 1950, and for two years he recorded for other labels, including Decca, King and Specialty. Among his recordings at King was "My Ding-a-Ling", which Bartholomew wrote and first recorded in January 1952; the song was later recorded by Chuck Berry, who had an international hit with it in 1972, although Berry substantially changed the song's arrangement and verses and claimed credit for writing it. While at Specialty, Bartholomew produced Lloyd Price's recording of "Lawdy Miss Clawdy", which featured Domino (uncredited) on piano. The single reached No. 1 on the R&B chart in mid-1952.

After that success, Bartholomew returned to Imperial to work again on Domino's recordings, co-writing and producing a series of R&B hits for him. Domino's crossover to the pop chart came in 1955 with "Ain't That a Shame" (initially titled "Ain't It A Shame"), on which Bartholomew deliberately sought to make Domino's style more appealing to white record buyers. Further hits followed through the late 1950s and early 1960s: "I'm in Love Again" and "Blue Monday" (both in 1956), "I'm Walkin'" (1957), "I'm Gonna Be a Wheel Someday" (1959), "Let the Four Winds Blow" (1961) — all co-written and produced by Bartholomew — and "Blueberry Hill" (1956) and "Walking to New Orleans" (1960), also produced by Bartholomew.

Over the same period, Bartholomew wrote, arranged, and produced recordings by many other Imperial artists, including Smiley Lewis (for whom Bartholomew wrote "I Hear You Knocking" and "One Night", both of which were hits and were later recorded by other musicians), the Spiders, Chris Kenner, Earl King, Tommy Ridgley, Robert Parker, T-Bone Walker, Roy Brown, Frankie Ford, and Shirley and Lee (who recorded for Aladdin Records and for whom Bartholomew produced "Let the Good Times Roll"). Several of Bartholomew's songs were later covered by other musicians. "Ain't That A Shame" was recorded successfully by Pat Boone; "I Hear You Knocking" was a hit for Gale Storm in the 1950s and Dave Edmunds in the 1970s; "One Night" and "Witchcraft" were hits for Elvis Presley; and "I'm Walkin'" was a hit for Ricky Nelson. On several of his songs, a co-writing credit was given to his wife, Pearl King (sometimes confused with the musician Earl King).

Later life and death
After Imperial was sold to Liberty Records in Los Angeles in 1963, Bartholomew remained in New Orleans, working for Trumpet Records and Mercury Records and then establishing his own label, Broadmoor Records, in 1967. The label folded the following year, when its distributor, Dover Records, collapsed.

In the 1970s and 1980s, Bartholomew led a traditional Dixieland jazz band in New Orleans, releasing an album, Dave Bartholomew's New Orleans Jazz Band, in 1981. He also took part in Fats Domino's international tours during that period. He was inducted into the Rock and Roll Hall of Fame as a non-performer in 1991, and released two further albums in that decade, Dave Bartholomew and the Maryland Jazz Band (1995) and New Orleans Big Beat (1998), while continuing to make occasional appearances with his band at festivals.

Bartholomew married Pearl King in 1942. After her death in 1967 he married Rhea (née Douse), with whom he had four sons and one daughter. He remained a resident of New Orleans, and celebrated his 100th birthday on Christmas Eve 2018, but plans for a celebration concert were suspended after he was hospitalized.

Bartholomew died of heart failure at East Jefferson General Hospital in Metairie, Louisiana on June 23, 2019, and was buried at St Gabriel the Archangel Catholic Church in Gentilly.

Chart hits and other notable songs

See also
 New Orleans rhythm and blues

References

External links
 Dave Bartholomew interview at NAMM Oral History Library (2003)
 
 

1918 births
2019 deaths
21st-century American male musicians
21st-century trumpeters
African-American centenarians
African-American songwriters
American centenarians
American jazz trumpeters
American male trumpeters
Imperial Records artists
Jazz musicians from New Orleans
American male jazz musicians
Men centenarians
Military personnel from Louisiana
People from Edgard, Louisiana
Rhythm and blues musicians from New Orleans
Songwriters from Louisiana
United States Army Band musicians
African-American Catholics
21st-century African-American musicians
20th-century African-American people
American male songwriters